The list of ship launches in 1794 includes a chronological list of some ships launched in 1794.


References

1794
Ship launches